Kamakhal is a rural locality (a selo) and the administrative centre of Kamakhalsky Selsoviet, Laksky District, Republic of Dagestan, Russia. The population was 51 as of 2010. There are 4 streets.

Geography 
Kamakhal is located 18 km northwest of Kumukh (the district's administrative centre) by road, on the Tsamtichay River. Palisma and Bukhty are the nearest rural localities.

Nationalities 
Laks live there.

References 

Rural localities in Laksky District